The black-headed sibia (Heterophasia desgodinsi) is a bird species in the family Leiothrichidae. In former times it was often included with the dark-backed sibia in H. melanoleuca. Together with most other sibias, it is sometimes separated in the genus Malacias.

It is found in China, Laos and Vietnam. Its natural habitat is subtropical or tropical moist montane forests.

References

Collar, N. J. & Robson C. 2007. Family Timaliidae (Babblers)  pp. 70 – 291 in; del Hoyo, J., Elliott, A. & Christie, D.A. eds. Handbook of the Birds of the World, Vol. 12. Picathartes to Tits and Chickadees. Lynx Edicions, Barcelona.

black-headed sibia
Birds of Yunnan
Birds of South China
Birds of Laos
Birds of Vietnam
black-headed sibia
Taxonomy articles created by Polbot